The Open Document Format for Office Applications, commonly known as OpenDocument, was based on OpenOffice.org XML, as used in OpenOffice.org 1, and was standardised by the Organization for the Advancement of Structured Information Standards (OASIS) consortium.

Process

OpenDocument 1.0 
The first to initiate the standardisation of what became the OpenDocument standard was the DKUUG standardisation committee on its meeting the 28th August 2001. The first official OASIS meeting to discuss the standard was December 16, 2002; OASIS approved OpenDocument as an OASIS standard on May 1, 2005.
 
The group decided to build on an earlier version of the OpenOffice.org XML format, since this was already an XML format with most of the desired properties, and had been in use since 2000 as the program's primary storage format. Note, however, that OpenDocument is not the same as the older OpenOffice.org XML format.

According to Gary Edwards, a member of the OpenDocument TC, the specification was developed in two phases. Phase one (which lasted from November 2002 through March 2004), had the goal of ensuring that the OpenDocument format could capture all the data from a vast array of older legacy systems. Phase Two focused on Open Internet based collaboration.

OASIS is one of the organizations which has been granted the right to propose standards directly to an ISO SC for "Fast-Track Processing". This process is specifically designed to allow an existing standard from any source be submitted without modification directly for vote as a 'Draft International Standard (DIS) (or Draft Amendment (DAM)). Accordingly, OASIS submitted the OpenDocument standard to JTC 1/SC 34 Document description and processing languages a joint technical committee of the International Organization for Standardization (ISO) and the International Electrotechnical Commission (IEC) for approval as an international ISO/IEC standard.  It was accepted as ISO/IEC DIS 26300, Open Document Format for Office Applications (OpenDocument) v1.0 draft International Standard (DIS), and it was published November 30, 2006 as ISO/IEC 26300:2006 Information technology -- Open Document Format for Office Applications (OpenDocument) v1.0.

Gary Edwards, a member of the OpenDocument TC, says that after ISO standardization, "there is no doubt in my mind that OpenDocument is heading to the W3C for ratification as the successor to HTML and XHTML.". The W3C has not made any public statements supporting or denying this statement, however.

OpenDocument 1.1 
Since Open Document Format for Office Applications (OpenDocument) v1.0 was accepted as an ISO/IEC standard, OASIS have updated their standard to v1.1 in 2007. This update includes additional features to address accessibility concerns. It was approved as an OASIS Standard on 2007-02-01 following a call for vote issued on 2007-01-16. The public announcement was made on 2007-02-13. This version was not initially submitted to ISO/IEC, because it is considered to be a minor update to ODF 1.0 only, and OASIS were working already on ODF 1.2 at the time ODF 1.1 was approved. However, it was some years later submitted to ISO/IEC (as of March 2011 it was in "enquiry stage" as Draft Amendment 1 - ISO/IEC 26300:2006/DAM 1) and published in March 2012 as ISO/IEC 26300:2006/Amd 1:2012 - Open Document Format for Office Applications (OpenDocument) v1.1.

OpenDocument 1.2 
OpenDocument v1.2 includes additional accessibility features, RDF-based metadata, a spreadsheet formula specification based on OpenFormula, support for digital signatures and some features suggested by the public.  OpenDocument 1.2 consists of three parts: Part 1: OpenDocument Schema, Part 2: Recalculated Formula (OpenFormula) Format and Part 3: Packages.  It was approved as an OASIS Committee Specification on 17 March 2011 and as an OASIS Standard on 29 September 2011.

In October 2011, the OASIS ODF Technical Committee expected to "start the process of submitting ODF 1.2 to ISO/IEC JTC 1 soon". In May 2012, the ISO/IEC JTC 1/SC 34/WG 6 members reported that "after some delay, the process of preparing ODF 1.2 for submission to JTC 1 for PAS transposition is now in progress". In October 2013, after a one-month review period for OASIS members, the OASIS Open Document Format for Office Applications (OpenDocument) Technical Committee requested that OASIS submit ODF 1.2 to the ISO/IEC Joint Technical Committee 1 (JTC1) for approval as a proposed International Standard under JTC1's "Publicly Available Specification" (PAS) transposition procedure.  This submission happened in late March 2014.  As of 3 April 2014, ODF 1.2 had reached the enquiry stage of ISO's ratification process. As a DIS, it has received unanimous approval by the national bodies in September 2014, as well as a number of comments that need to be resolved. It was published as an ISO/IEC international standard on 17 June 2015.

OpenDocument 1.3 
The most important new features of ODF 1.3 are digital signatures for documents and OpenPGP-based encryption of XML documents, with improvements in areas such as change tracking and document security, additional details in the description of elements in first pages, text, numbers and charts, and other timely improvements.

OpenDocument version history

Participants 
The standardization process included the vendors of office suites or related document systems, including (in alphabetical order):
 Adobe (Framemaker, Distiller)
 Corel (WordPerfect)
 IBM (Lotus 1-2-3, Workplace)
 KDE (Calligra, former KOffice)
 Sun Microsystems (StarOffice/OpenOffice.org)

Document-using organizations who initiated or were involved in the standardization process included (alphabetically):
 Boeing
 Intel (they are developing sample documents as a test suite) (Bastian, 2005)
 National Archives of Australia
 New York State Office of the Attorney General
 Novell (Berlind, October 25, 2005)
 Society of Biblical Literature
 Sony
 Stellent

As well as having formal members, draft versions of the specification were released to the public and subject to worldwide review. External comments were then adjudicated publicly by the committee.

See also
Standardization of Office Open XML

References

External links
OASIS OpenDocument Technical Committee coordinates the OpenDocument development and is the official source for specifications, schemas, etc.
OASIS OpenDocument Specifications

Document-centric XML-based standards
ISO standards
LibreOffice
Markup languages
Open formats
OpenDocument
OpenOffice